Women's football is not as popular in Brazil as men's football, although it has increased in popularity since the 2000s.

History
Due to strong and continuing social stigma, Brazilian society only minimally supports women's football. There is a sexist belief in the country that football is not a sport for women. It was illegal for women to play football in Brazil from 1941 to 1979. Until recently, the country lacked a national women's league, organizing only state competitions because there was limited financial interest and support for the women's game. The Copa do Brasil de Futebol Feminino was first played in 2007. In 2013, a nationwide league, the Campeonato Brasileiro de Futebol Feminino Série A1, was officially started and became the country's premier women's domestic competition, helping to increase the quality of Brazilian women's football. Despite all issues, Brazilian clubs have won most editions of the Copa Libertadores Femenina (11).

Women's football in Brazil only recently became more popular. During the 20th century, women were discouraged from playing "masculine" sports such as football and told they should focus more on aesthetic sports such as gymnastics. The health experts in Brazil at the time even claimed that females playing these sports were at risk of becoming homosexual. At a very young age, young boys were taught to be strong while girls were taught how to become better mothers. Women were often bullied for playing football and forced to leave fields in order to make more time for men to play. Despite the social challenges, women still continued to play football as officials worried about the masculinization of the female body and how detrimental that would be to their society. These fears sparked President Getúlio Vargas to organize a national sports council to establish sports guidelines. The council proceeded to ban women from playing any aggressive sports such as football due to health precautions. Many female players resisted this ban; Primavera FC continued to play up until they ran out of funding and resources. This law was not strictly upheld as some women continued to play. In the 1970's women's football was gaining popularity across the world; this inspired several feminist protests in Brazil. Eventually the ban on women's football in Brazil was finally lifted in 1983 influenced by the Union of European Football Associations.

The best players, such as Marta and Cristiane, were accidentally discovered and directly invited to play in the Brazil national team. In recent years, the national team contested World Cup finals and Olympics gold medals, increasing the popularity of TV broadcasts for those tournaments. However, this was not sufficient to stimulate the footballing culture among women who prefer to support men's football over women's. Brazil has developed a major rivalry with the United States women's national soccer team.

In 2014 FIFA World Cup held in their nation, Brazilian men's team had made a serious disappointment after only gaining fourth place. This created a huge support for the women's team with hopes that they could gain the title in the women's tournament of 2015 FIFA Women's World Cup, although Brazil failed to advance from the round of 16.

From 2020, Brazilian female footballers will receive equal pay, a major step in the development of women's football in the nation.

Current system
 Série A
 Série A2
 Série A3

Domestic cups
 Copa do Brasil (discontinued)
 Supercopa do Brasil de Futebol Feminino

State championships
 Rio de Janeiro
 São Paulo

State cups
 São Paulo

See also
Football in Brazil
Brazil women's national football team
Bans of women's association football

References